The shooting down of Malaysia Airlines Flight 17 on 17 July 2014 provoked reactions from many countries and organisations.

Countries

 In an address to the parliament, Australian Prime Minister Tony Abbott said that the aircraft was downed by a missile which seems to have been launched by Russian-backed rebels. Moreover, Julie Bishop, the Australian Minister for Foreign Affairs said in an interview on an Australian television programme that it was "extraordinary" that her Russian counterparts have refused to speak to her over the shoot-down after the Russian ambassador was summoned to meet her. The Russian government was critical of Abbott's response, branding his comments as "inappropriate" and an "accusation of guilt based on speculation", as Abbott was one of the first world leaders to publicly connect the shoot-down to Russia. Abbott later criticised the recovery efforts as "shambolic", and "more like a garden clean-up than a forensic investigation", while Bishop publicly warned separatist forces against treating the victims' bodies as hostages.

The downing of the flight had resulted in the death of 38 Australian citizens and residents. In the lead up to the 2014 G20 meeting in Brisbane, Tony Abbott sought to focus attention on Russia's role in the shooting. In a meeting with Russian President Vladimir Putin at the APEC meeting in Beijing, Abbott reportedly told the president that Australia had information that the missile that destroyed the plane had Russian origin and that Russia should consider apologising and offering appropriate restitution to the victims of the shooting. Russia continued to deny involvement.

Australian Prime Minister Malcolm Turnbull stated that, after the release of the Dutch Safety Board report into the shoot-down, Australia "will not be bullied by Russia" and that "those who committed this crime must answer for it". Turnbull also stated in regards to the Russian veto at the UN Security Council that "we [Australia] deplore the conduct of Russia using its Security Council veto in July to block the establishment of a special international criminal tribunal".

 Austrian Foreign Affairs Minister Sebastian Kurz called for a full investigation of the cause of the tragedy and a "free access for the experts".

 The Crown Prince of Bahrain Salman bin Hamad Al-Khalifa expressed his sincere condolences following the tragic crash of the aircraft, on behalf of His Majesty King Hamad and the Kingdom of Bahrain, to the King, government and people of Malaysia during a telephone conversation with the Malaysian Prime Minister. HRH Crown Prince asked God Almighty to protect Malaysia and other Muslim countries from such tragedies. He expressed his deepest sympathy for the families of the victims, praying for their souls to rest in peace and for their families to find courage and strength.

 Bangladeshi Prime Minister Sheikh Hasina expressed her deep shock over the crash of Malaysian passenger airliner. In her message of condolence to Malaysian Prime Minister on behalf of the government and the people of Bangladesh, "We pray that Almighty Allah may grant eternal peace to the departed souls and courage and fortitude to the families of the victims to bear the loss". Bangladeshi Foreign Minister AH Mahmood Ali sent a separate message to the Malaysian foreign minister. He also expressed his shock and conveyed his deep condolence and heartfelt sympathy to the members of the bereaved families.

 Belarusian President Alexander Lukashenko sent condolences to the head of state of Malaysia, the King of the Netherlands and the Governor-General of the Commonwealth of Australia over the victims of the Malaysia Airlines plane crash. In a statement, he said "On behalf of the Belarusian people I extend sincere condolences in connection with the terrible crash of the Malaysia Airlines Boeing 777 in the Ukrainian airspace".

 Belgian Prime Minister Elio Di Rupo said "On behalf of the Belgian government, he expressed his sincere condolences to the families and friends of the many victims of the flight of Malaysia Airlines. His thoughts are paying particular to the five Belgian victims, their families and friends. He also expressed deep sympathy with the Dutch people and the Dutch authorities. Di Rupo said he wanted "full clarity comes over the exact circumstances of this tragedy and that those responsible are quickly identified and brought to justice".

 Brazilian President Dilma Rousseff said in a statement that "the Brazilian government will be in the neutral position until there is clearer information about the incident". She stressed that it is necessary to find those responsible for the shot down.

 His Majesty the Sultan of Brunei Hassanal Bolkiah has sent condolence messages to Malaysian and Dutch leaders following the crash of Malaysia Airlines flight MH17 in Ukraine. In his messages, the monarch said he was deeply saddened to hear of the shocking news. His Majesty further said Her Majesty Pengiran Anak Saleha, the government and people of Brunei joined him in expressing their condolences and sympathies to the victims' families. The Sultan also prayed that "Allah S.W.T would bestow His blessings upon the victims' souls and place them among his loved and pious ones".

 Bulgarian President Rosen Plevneliev sent his condolences to the King of the Netherlands and Malaysia on behalf of the Bulgarian people for the families and relatives of the victims. The president strongly condemns any act of violence, which leads to loss of life and calls for the immediate and full international investigation to establish the causes and those responsible for what happened.

 Canadian Prime Minister Stephen Harper issued a statement saying that he was "shocked and saddened" to have learned of the downing of the flight. He also stated that while it was not clear what caused the crash, the Government of Canada continued "to condemn Russia’s military aggression and illegal occupation of Ukraine, which is at the root of the ongoing conflict in the region." Foreign Affairs Minister John Baird has called for a "credible and unimpeded" international investigation into the crash and called for pro-Russian forces to withdraw from the crash site. Baird also levelled blame for the accident on Russia and the rebels saying "The Kremlin may not have pulled the trigger, but it certainly loaded the gun and put it in the murderer’s hand".

 Chilean government gives its heartfelt condolences to the families of the victims and asked that an investigation need to be conducted with "extensive, rigorous and transparent facts". The perpetrators also should not may go unpunished and any other accomplices must be brought to justice.

 Chinese President Xi Jinping sent condolences to the Malaysian and Dutch King over the loss of lives in the downed aircraft, adding that he urged for an independent and fair investigation of the tragedy. While Chinese Foreign Ministry spokesman Qin Gang also offered his deep condolence to all victims.

 Colombian President Juan Manuel Santos issued a statement saying that he gave out instructions to the embassy for the United Nations to "back-up any actions leading to establishing the truth and those responsible of this atrocious crime in Ukraine". Colombia's Ministry of Foreign Affairs issued a press release expressing its condolences to the friends and families of the 298 victims that left the downing of the Malaysia Airlines aircraft. The press release ended with the Ministry claiming that "We (Colombia) join with the international community to demand that the involved parties in Ukraine allow a transparent, credible, and urgent investigation in the shortest time possible".

 Costa Rica through its foreign ministry condemn the brutal attack on a commercial flight that was carrying civilians, which constitutes a crime against humanity.

 Cuban former President Fidel Castro blames the government of Ukraine for the downing of the Malaysian aeroplane.

 Cypriot President Nicos Anastasiades signed the book of condolences at the Dutch Embassy in Nicosia and expressed sympathy to the government and people of the Netherlands. Earlier, the Cypriot Ministry of Foreign Affairs called for an immediate investigation and extend their condolences to the families of the victims on board by conveying sympathy to the Prime Ministers of the Netherlands and Malaysia as well as to the governments of all other nations of which citizens have senselessly lost their lives in the tragic incident.

 Czech Foreign Minister Lubomír Zaorálek during a meeting at the Council of the European Union for Foreign Affairs expressed his deep condolences to the families of the victims and the governments of the involved countries. He added "Separatists must ensure unrestricted and safe access to the point of impact of the aeroplane, enabling examination of the accident and to ensure humane treatment and repatriation of victims. Those who committed this crime will be held accountable. We demand dignified treatment of the remains of the victims and permanent access to international disaster experts, in order to perform a proper independent investigation".

 Danish Prime Minister Helle Thorning-Schmidt called for a "thorough and independent" inquiry into the incident and called the international community to reach an agreement on how to hold the responsible parties accountable. On a statement, she said "We completely support calls for a thorough and independent investigation to be carried out soon into the circumstances that led to this tragic incident and we need the international community to discuss what consequences there should be and how to hold those responsible accountable".

 President Taur Matan Ruak expressed "shocked" over the tragedy and offered condolences to the Malaysian government and in particular, to the bereaved families and the countries of the nationalities involved.

 Ecuador through its Ministry of Foreign Affairs and Human Mobility expressed their "deep regret" over what happened to the flight and expressed "its solidarity with the families of the victims". The Foreign Ministry of Ecuador also strongly condemn the action and support a thorough investigation.

 The Estonian Prime Minister Taavi Rõivas on his statement, "We are going on to tightening sanctions against Russia. It is our moral obligation to the victims of MH17". Estonian Foreign Minister Urmas Paet said that his country is ready to participate on the MH17 investigation.

 Fiji's interim Prime Minister Frank Bainimarama has sent his condolences to Australia over the loss of lives in the Malaysia Airlines crash.

 Finnish President Sauli Niinistö and Prime Minister Alexander Stubb have offered their condolences to those affected by the loss of life aboard the flight. Niinistö said he offered his deepest condolences on his own behalf as well as on behalf of the people of Finland to the families and loved ones of the victims. The written message was sent to the Malaysian Prime Minister as well as to the King of the Netherlands. Stubb called for all parties to immediately launch a thorough and independent investigation into the events in eastern Ukraine. Niinistö also had spoken on telephone with Vladimir Putin to ensure that Russia is fully co-operating to probe the shooting down of the flight. He told Putin that the plane's fate must be determined by an impartial, independent international investigation, and that blocking or endangering this would be reprehensible.

 French President François Hollande offered "all of his solidarity" with relatives of the crash victims, and made calls for a wide-ranging investigation to find the cause of the tragedy.

 The Georgian Foreign Ministry express its deep sadness over the crash and demand an investigation on the causes which led to the tragedy. The Foreign Ministry conveys its sincere condolences to the governments and people of the Netherlands, Malaysia and of all those countries whose citizens were on board the aircraft, and expresses its solidarity with the families of the victims. Adding "At this stage, it can be unequivocally stated that the crash is a disastrous consequence of the armed conflict in Ukraine, which is in breach of national and international law and of the country's sovereignty and territorial integrity".

 German Chancellor Angela Merkel called for an immediate ceasefire in Ukraine to permit a probe into the apparent downing of a passenger plane in the rebel-held east of the country and a swift, independent inquiry. Merkel said Russia in particular must do its part to end the conflict, adding that Moscow bore responsibility. The Chancellor also had telephoned Malaysian Prime Minister Najib Razak to express her condolences over the tragedy and said Germany was prepared to assist Malaysia.

 Greek Deputy Prime Minister and Foreign Minister Evangelos Venizelos expressed deep condolences over the air tragedy, saying "the loss of so many lives causes deep sorrow. We express condolences to the families of the victims and we expect an independent international investigation which will fully clarify the causes of the tragedy". In the light of information that the plane was allegedly shot down, the Greek leader repeated a plea "for the peaceful resolution of the crisis in eastern Ukraine to avoid acts which could lead to the increase of tension".

 The Government of Guatemala presents its condolences to the families of the victims and governments of the different nationalities of the dead passengers. The Guatemalan Ministry of Foreign Affairs urged the relevant authorities to investigate.

 Pope Francis has pledged his prayers for the victims of Malaysia Airlines flight MH17. In a statement, the Vatican said the Pontiff had learnt "with dismay" of the tragedy of the aeroplane downed in east Ukraine and said the Pope would pray for the numerous victims of the incident and for their relatives.

 Prime Minister Viktor Orbán said in a radio interview that the "unusual, rare and shocking" downing of the Malaysian passenger jet over the eastern part of Ukraine requires a thorough investigation. Earlier the Hungarian Ministry of Foreign Affairs and Foreign Trade said "it is important that an independent international body to investigate the circumstances of the Malaysian airliner tragedy".

 Icelandic Minister for Foreign Affairs Gunnar Bragi Sveinsson expresses condolences to the families and friends of the people on board of the aeroplane and expresses strong condemnation for the shot down. On his statement, he said "It is horrendous that a passenger plane has been shot down with advanced anti-aircraft weapons". He has urged that an objective international investigation be initiated immediately and stressed that rescue workers must be allowed to do their job properly. The minister also urged the international community to join forces to stop the conflict in Eastern Ukraine.

 Indian President Pranab Mukherjee deeply condoled the crash of the passenger jet in eastern Ukraine and expressed grief and sympathy over the tragedy which has claimed 298 lives. In a message to the King of Malaysia, Abdul Halim, the President said, "I wish to convey my sincere grief and sympathy to the government and people of Malaysia on the crash of the Malaysian Airlines flight in eastern Ukraine yesterday leading to the loss of so many precious lives. Our thoughts and prayers are with the families of the nationals of Malaysia and other countries who lost their lives in this tragic incident". Indian Minister of External Affairs Sushma Swaraj personally wrote to Malaysian Foreign Affairs Minister Anifah Aman to convey that India would stand by the people and government of Malaysia in this difficult time.

 Indonesian President Susilo Bambang Yudhoyono asked that whoever shot down the aircraft be punished unequivocally, and offered to help with the investigation. The Indonesian government has taken a cautious diplomatic stance over Russia's alleged involvement in the downing and the President also had offered his "deep condolences" to Malaysia and the families of the victims.

 Iranian President Hassan Rouhani has expressed his deepest sympathy to Malaysian Prime Minister and the Malaysian citizens over the tragic crash. In a message conveyed to Najib, which was made available by the Iranian Embassy in Malaysia, he said "the news of the air crash had caused "deep regret and sorrow". "Undoubtedly, this tragedy and huge grief which covers a lot of nations, highlights the importance of peaceful coexistence and collective action against violence and conflict, in the view of the international community".

 Italian President Giorgio Napolitano is waiting for a "confident, fair and transparent collaborative effort" to clarify the causes of the crash. He added "I have learned with dismay and deep sorrow the news of the tragic disaster that occurred in the Ukrainian sky, determining the loss of so many innocent lives. At this time of mourning, on behalf of the whole Italian people, I offer to families victims the expression of sincere sympathy". While Foreign Minister Federica Mogherini in a statement said "I learned with great suffering about the Malaysian Airlines passenger plane's tragedy. Now it is necessary to shed light on what happened as soon as possible through an independent commission of inquiry to get to the truth".

 The Jamaican Senate expressed their deepest "sympathies and heartfelt sorrow" for what had taken place and called for an "immediate investigation into the matter". International community also been called to be "more assertive and be more effective" against terrorists.

 According to the Japanese Chief Cabinet Secretary Yoshihide Suga, Japan will step up a sanctions against Russia following the downing of the Malaysia Airlines Flight MH17. Japan also had expressed its sympathies and declared that Japanese flag on its embassy in Malaysia will be fly at half-mast on 22 August.

 Kazakhstani President Nursultan Nazarbayev expressed his condolences to Malaysian Prime Minister Najib Razak and Malaysians who lost their loved ones in the crash of the MH17 flight in Ukraine. In his letter to the Malaysian Prime Minister, he "was deeply saddened by the news about the crash of the Malaysian Airlines plane on the territory of Ukraine. On behalf of all Kazakhstanis, he expressed his sincere condolences to Malaysians on their tragic loss".

 Kenyan President Uhuru Kenyatta in his Twitter conveyed a condolence message to the people of Malaysia.

 Kosovo's Foreign Affairs Minister Enver Hoxhaj condemned what he called a terrorist attack against civilian population and the international community saying that the "Republic of Kosovo strongly supports an international investigation that would clarify the circumstances of this shocking tragedy. Kosovo population stand by the victim families, people and governments in these painful moments of an international tragedy", wrote Mr. Hoxhaj in telegrams sent to his counterparts in the countries whose citizens lost lives in this tragic crash.

 Laotian Prime Minister Thongsing Thammavong sent his message of condolences to his Malaysian, Indonesian and Australian counterparts concerning the crash of the aeroplane. While Deputy Minister of Foreign Affairs, Saleumxay Kommasith represented the Lao government in expressing the nation's sadness over the Malaysian plane crash in Ukraine during the signing of a condolence book at the Malaysian Embassy in Vientiane. On his statement, "On behalf of the people of Laos, I would like to express my deepest condolences over the tragic accident involving the Malaysian Airlines flight MH 17 that crashed in the east of Ukraine on 17 July 2014, killing all 298 passengers including 43 Malaysian citizens and crew members. I would like to share this moment of sadness and my heartfelt sympathies with the government and people of Malaysia".

 Latvian President Andris Bērziņš urged a thorough and conclusive investigation of the MH17 disaster to pinpoint the perpetrators responsible for the downed passenger airliner. The president called it "a horrific precedent that madmen could just go and murder so many innocent people". He added "the guilty must be punished so that no one would ever again feel the itch to play with such heavy sophisticated weapons without considering the consequences" – "let it loose, see where it hits". While Latvian Foreign Affairs Minister Edgars Rinkēvičs has banned three popular Russian musicians - Oleg Gazmanov, Joseph Kobzon and Alla Perfilova from travelling to Latvia for an indefinite period of time. The decision has been made in accordance with the Immigration Law and Rinkēvičs previously announced that he had decided to ban "apologists of Russian imperialism and aggression from attending "high society" events in Latvia". The ministry's press secretary Karlis Eihenbaums told LETA that the minister's decision is connected with the events in Ukraine over the past few days, when a passenger plane crashed in eastern Ukraine resulting in 298 casualties.

 Lebanon's Foreign Affairs Ministry condemned all terrorist attacks irrespective of their motivation or cause, sending out condolences to the victims of the plane crash.

 Lithuanian President Dalia Grybauskaitė called the incident a "brutal act of terror and stressed that people behind the tragedy must be clearly identified and brought to justice. It is a brutal act of terror which has shown explicitly that efforts of the international community to solve the crisis in Ukraine have been too weak. It is unjustifiable that in the 21st century Europe innocent people - dozens of children among them - die of weapons. Perpetrators must be named clearly and assume responsibility. Conditions must be established for the international observers to determine the executors and organisers of the tragedy". The Prime Minister Algirdas Butkevičius also conveyed condolences over the crash, "We are deeply shaken by the event, which killed 298 innocent people including children. The accident would have clearly been prevented, if the conflict in Eastern Ukraine had not been escalated". While Raimonda Murmokaitė as the Lithuanian Permanent Representative to the United Nations urged to respect the memory of the victims of the catastrophe of MH17 and condemned any attempts to influence or interfere with the independent investigation conducted by the Dutch Safety Board.

 Prime Minister Xavier Bettel expressed his deep sympathy to all the victim families. In his statement on Twitter, he said "I am with my thoughts are with the families and friends of the many innocent victims of the crash of MH17. This terrible incident shocked me deeply and shows the need that we must continue to fight for peace". A memorial service has been held on 27 September for all victims on board.

 Malaysian Deputy Foreign Minister Hamzah Zainuddin said that the foreign ministry would be working closely with the Russian and Ukrainian governments with regard to the incident. Prime Minister Najib Razak later said that Malaysia was unable to verify the cause of the crash and demanded that the perpetrators be punished. The Malaysian government has declared to fly the country national flag at half-mast from 18 July until 21 July.

 President Abdulla Yameen sent his condolences to the King of Malaysia and Netherlands as well to Prime Minister Najib and Rutte and all victims families involved.

 Mauritanian President Mohamed Ould Abdel Aziz sent a message of condolences to the King of the Netherlands, following the crash in which many Dutch citizens were killed. In his message, "Majesty, It is with great sadness that we learned the crash on 17 July 2014 of the Malaysia Airlines aircraft in which several Dutch citizens were killed. In these painful circumstances, I express to Your Majesty and, through it, to the people, the Government of Dutch and to the families of the victims our sincere condolences and compassion, while ensuring our solidarity in this painful punishment".

 The Mexican Foreign Minister through José Antonio Meade on behalf of Mexican government expressed their deep shock and sadness. In a joint statement of MIKTA, the Mexican also strongly condemn the downing of Malaysia Airlines Flight MH17 which took the lives of 298 innocent civilians, including many children. They express their deepest condolences to the families of the victims and to the governments and peoples of 12 States whose nationals lost their lives in this heinous act and calls for a full, thorough and independent international investigation into the incident in accordance with international civil aviation guidelines and demands that all military activities in the area cease to allow immediate, safe, secure and unrestricted access to investigating authorities.

 Moldovan President Nicolae Timofti conveyed a message of condolence. In a statement, the President expressed sympathy for the families of the victims of the disaster involving the Malaysia Airlines MH17 aircraft with 298 people on board. "It is with deep regret and sympathy we learned of the tragic plane crash, resulting in numerous casualties. At this time of mourning, on behalf of the Moldovan people and on my own behalf, I express sincere feelings of solidarity and sympathy".

 Namibian President Hifikepunye Pohamba described the shooting down as "tragic". In his condolence message to Malaysian Prime Minister, the president extended his deepest sorrow to the "bereaved families of many nationalities who lost their loved ones". He said "On behalf of the Government and the people of Namibia and indeed on my own behalf, I wish to extend our most sincere condolences to the government and the people of Malaysia and wished the Malaysian government strength as they deal with yet another air tragedy since the disappearance of Malaysia Airlines Flight MH370 on 8 March".

 Dutch Prime Minister Mark Rutte and King Willem-Alexander voiced their shock at the crash. Minister of Foreign Affairs Frans Timmermans will join the Dutch investigation team sent to Ukraine. Dutch government buildings flew the flag at half-mast on 18 July. Music was cancelled and festivities were toned down during the last, usually festive, day of the Nijmegen Marches. On 21 July the Netherlands officially opened war crimes investigation regarding the downing of the aircraft. The country's prosecutor is said to be already located in Ukraine for that purpose. Rutte also threatened tough action against Russia if it would avoid assistance in the investigation. On 23 July, when the first victims were repatriated, it was a National Day of Mourning in the Netherlands, the first time an official Day of Mourning had been organised in the country since 1962, after Queen Wilhelmina had died.

 The New Zealand Parliament has unanimously passed a motion expressing New Zealand's condolences to the families of victims of Malaysia Airlines flight MH17, and criticising those who have impeded investigations into the tragedy. Prime Minister John Key said "New Zealand called on those groups to co-operate immediately and unreservedly with international authorities, and he urged Russia to use its influence with those groups to ensure the investigation and recovery operation proceeded appropriately and unimpeded. New Zealand was also saddened by the "grievous" casualties borne by other nations, particularly the Netherlands, Malaysia, and Australia".

 Nigeria expressed full support for an independent international investigation into the airline flight disaster in eastern Ukraine. Nigeria's Permanent Representative to the United Nations Professor Joy Ogwu expressed his country support at an emergency session of the United Nations Security Council. He described the downing of flight MH17 as an "apocalyptic end of the world" and urging the rebels in eastern Ukraine "to co-operate fully and unconditionally with investigations into the crash".

 Prime Minister Erna Solberg during an interview with the NRK said it was a tragic event. "Our thoughts go out first and foremost to all the families and relatives who have lost their nearest. We have sent our condolences to the Netherlands and Malaysia, where many of the victims came from and I'm saddened by the terrible Malaysian Airlines incident. My thoughts are with all those affected".

 Prime Minister Nawaz Sharif sent a letter to his Malaysian counterpart Najib Razak expressing condolences and grief on behalf of the government and people of Pakistan. "In this hour of bereavement and immense grief, the Government and people of Pakistan join me to express our heartfelt condolences and sympathies to the government and people of Malaysia and to the families of all passengers who were on board the unfortunate flight".

 The Panamanian government conveys its condolences to the families of the victims and calls on the international community for a lasting peace. "Our solidarity and condolences at this difficult time for the Malaysian people and more than nine nations affected by this incident", said the Panamanian Ministry of Foreign Affairs in a statement, which also seeks to "clarify the cause".

 Prime Minister Peter O'Neill has expressed his sorrow and concern at the loss of the flight. On his statement, "The loss of this aircraft has shocked the world, this is a tragic day for people from many nations. Our sympathy and prayers are with the families who now are left to deal with this tragic loss. On behalf of the people of Papua New Guinea, I express my deep condolences to the nations of the passengers. We pray for people in the Netherlands, Malaysia, Australia, Indonesia, the United Kingdom, Germany, Belgium, the Philippines, the United States, Canada and New Zealand who have lost citizens. The cause of the incident must be fully investigated and there needs to be a United Nations-led investigation into the crash of this aircraft, if it is found that this aircraft was brought down by human action, justice must be sought".

 The Department of Foreign Affairs in a statement said "The Philippines condemns in the strongest manner the recent shooting down of Malaysian Airlines flight MH17 over Ukraine. We convey our profound condolences for all who perished in this tragedy and those responsible should be made fully accountable for this unconscionable assault on a non-military aircraft that posed no threat whatsoever to any party". The Philippine embassy in Malaysia had fly its flag at half-mast on 24 July.

 President Bronisław Komorowski described the attack as an "unbelievable and shameful act which is an act of terror". He stressed the parties responsible for the downing of the aeroplane over the eastern territories of Ukraine should be held to account. The Polish government on 24 July cancelled the "Polish Year in Russia" and "Russian Year in Poland" that were planned for 2015.

 Portuguese President Aníbal Cavaco Silva sent his condolences to the families of the 298 people who lost their lives in the Malaysian aeroplane and to all those who "suffered the pain of human loss" as well to the Heads of State of the Netherlands, Malaysia and all countries concerned. The Portuguese Government has issued a statement expressing their condolences to the relatives of the victims and stresses that "the circumstances of this tragedy demand an independent investigation. Therefore we appeals for the full cooperation and information exchange between the parties involved and emphasises that this incident reinforces the need to find a peaceful solution to the territory of eastern Ukraine and the urgency of a ceasefire immediately in the region".

 The Irish Minister for Foreign Affairs and Trade Charles Flanagan said in a statement, "Ireland fully supports calls for a full, independent international investigation to establish the cause of this grave tragedy and to ensure that those responsible are swiftly brought to justice".

 Romanian President Traian Băsescu declared himself "appalled" by the tragic event that occurred in Ukraine's airspace and asked for immediate clarification of the circumstances in which the plane crash occurred. He said EU experts should participate in the investigation along with Ukrainian authorities.

 Russian President Vladimir Putin said responsibility for the crash rests with "the country whose airspace the plane was in when it crashed", and that "the disaster wouldn't happen if the military action in south-east of Ukraine was not reenabled". He further said that it was important to refrain from making any hasty conclusions and politicised statements before the end of the investigation. He said that Russia was ready to provide necessary assistance in organising and carrying out a thorough international inquiry led by ICAO. On 19 July Russian Ministry of Defence announced "10 questions to the Ukrainian government", repeating accusations earlier published in Russian media. Russian citizens brought flowers to the Dutch embassy in Moscow.

 Saudi Arabian Ambassador to Malaysia, Fahad A. H. Alrashid expressed sympathy and sadness over the aircraft tragedy. On his statement "I'm sorry about what had happened (to the aircraft) and I hope God will give strength to the families", he said after attending an Iftar here on 25 July.

 Seychellois President James Michel expressed his sincere condolences to the King of the Netherlands, government and people of the Netherlands as well to the Prime Minister of Malaysia and the Malaysian people while describing the attack as "an incomprehensible human tragedy".

 In a statement by the Ministry of Foreign Affairs, the Government and people of Singapore send their deepest condolences to the families of the victims of the tragic crash. In their statement, "We stand in solidarity with the Government and people of Malaysia during this difficult period. It is important that a full and transparent investigation take place to establish what caused the crash. The investigation team should be given full access to the affected areas and evidence. We stand ready to offer any possible assistance".

 Slovakian President Andrej Kiska sent letters of condolences to Dutch and Malaysian King. In his condolence letters, the President expressed his deep grief over the tragic fate of the MH17 flight and voiced his heartfelt sympathy with the relatives of the victims. At the same time, he expressed the strong belief that the cause and circumstances of the tragedy would be thoroughly investigated with assistance from international experts without delay. The Foreign Ministry also expressed its sincere sympathy with all of those bereaved by the tragedy and urged the respective authorities to secure an independent international probe into the potential causes of the tragedy.

 The Slovenian Ministry of Foreign Affairs has called for an independent and comprehensive international investigation into the crash of the flight over eastern Ukraine. The foreign ministry said "Only on the basis of such an investigation those responsible for the tragedy could be held accountable".

 Prime Minister Gordon Darcy Lilo sent his condolences to families of victims of the airline disaster. In a statement, he says "he joins world leaders in expressing sympathy to the families of the victims of MH17, and strongly condemns the horrendous act of terrorism against innocent global citizens. He supports the call of world leaders for an international independent investigation into the gunning down of the plane to find out the perpetrators and those that were found to carry out the unspeakable act must face justice". Adding "the Government and people of Solomon Islands were in shock to learn of the act of terrorism, and join the rest of the world in mourning the loss of the innocent lives on the MH17 flight".

South African Minister of International Relations and Cooperation Maite Nkoana-Mashabane urged world leaders not to jump to conclusions on the incident. President Jacob Zuma sent a message of condolence to Malaysia and called for independent investigation, saying: "We also extend our sympathies to the Government and the people of Malaysia, as well as all countries that have lost their citizens in the tragic crash. South Africa calls for a thorough, transparent and independent investigation to determine the cause of the incident".

 South Korean President Park Geun-hye sent a messages of condolence to Malaysian Prime Minister Najib Razak and Dutch Prime Minister Mark Rutte concerning the downing of Malaysia Airlines flight MH17. The President expressed her condolences and sympathy for the victims and members of the bereaved families and hope that in the near future the Dutch and Malaysian people will be able to overcome this shock and sadness.

 Spanish Prime Minister Mariano Rajoy said in a statement "the world has a right to know" who fired the missile that brought down Malaysia Airlines plane in pro-Russian separatist territory in eastern Ukraine, the world has a right to know who carried out this "barbaric act" and the world has a right to know what has happened and everybody will have to do everything possible to make sure that a savage act like this doesn't happen again". Earlier the Spanish Foreign Ministry expressed its condolences and said it shared the pain of families and loved ones of the 298 victims. Spain hopes an investigation can explain the circumstances of the accident as quickly as possible and we urged the parties involved to participate fully in the investigation.

 Sri Lankan President Mahinda Rajapaksa has conveyed condolences via Twitter to families on the loss of loved ones on Malaysian Airlines Flight MH17. On his statement "Please convey my condolences to the people of Malaysia on the loss of loved ones on Malaysian Airlines Flight MH17". He also added that "I also want to send out my condolences and that of the Sri Lankan people to all other families suffering from the loss of a loved one on MH17". In a statement released by the Sri Lankan Ministry of External Affairs, "The government together with the people of Sri Lanka convey heartfelt condolences and deepest sympathies to the families of the passengers and the crew who were on board the flight, and express solidarity with those nations whose citizens perished in this appalling incident".

 Surinamese President Desi Bouterse sent a message of condolence to the Dutch government and expressed his condolences and sympathy for the victims and members of the bereaved families concerning the downing of Malaysia Airlines flight MH17. Schools and members of the Surinamese government signed the book of condolences at the Dutch embassy. Six of the victims were Dutch nationals of Surinamese origin including a newly wed Indo Surinamese couple and four members of the Javanese Surinamese diaspora community.

 Prime Minister Fredrik Reinfeldt on behalf of the Swedish government sent a condolence letter to Malaysian Prime Minister Najib Razak and Dutch Prime Minister Mark Rutte. The Swedish flag has been declared at half-mast on 23 July at the Swedish embassy in The Hague, the Netherlands. While Swedish Foreign Minister Carl Bildt described the shot down as "an act by international gangsters".

 Tajikistani President Emomali Rahmon expressed his condolences to Malaysian Prime Minister and to the King of the Netherlands over the crash of the aeroplane. On his statement, he told "the people of Tajikistan are very saddened to hear the news about the terrible tragedy of Malaysia Airlines Boeing-777 that happened over Ukraine and led to numerous casualties. I express my deepest condolences to the friendly and brotherly people of Malaysia and ask you to pass my most sincere words of compassion and support to the families and friends of the victims". While in his condolences telegram to the Dutch King, he expressed the most sincere condolences to the large number of Dutch people.

 Tanzanian President Jakaya Kikwete sent a condolence message to Malaysian Prime Minister. In a statement, he said "I have learnt with great shock and sorrow the sad news of the loss of so many lives due to the crash of a Malaysian airliner on its way from Amsterdam to Kuala Lumpur that occurred on Ukrainian territory on Thursday 17th July 2014. The crash is an immense tragedy not only for the loved ones of those who perished but also for all the people of Malaysia and their friends. As a country, our thoughts and prayers are with the people of Malaysia in this time of grief. On behalf of the Government and the people of Tanzania, and indeed on my own behalf, I offer you our sincere condolences, support and solidarity".

 The National Council for Peace and Order (NCPO) head General Prayuth Chan-ocha on a statement expressed its condolences to the countries impacted by the Malaysia Airlines flight MH17 crash in Ukraine. On behalf of the Thai government, he extended his condolences to world leaders who suffered the loss of their people and to the families of the many victims. He added "Thailand stands in solidarity with the peoples and governments of the crash victims at this difficult time. Thailand also demands an independent and transparent investigation into the incident and is ready to provide assistance to the international community".

 Gambian ambassador to Malaysia Jobe-Njie representing the Gambian President and the Gambian people conveyed her sympathies over the tragic accidents that marred the Malaysian national air carrier.

 Prime Minister Kamla Persad-Bissessar in a statement express her condolence, in her statement, she said "It is with great sadness that I learnt of the tragedy of Malaysia Airlines flight MH 17 on 17 July 2014 in which 289 persons lost their lives, among which 189 are reported to be Dutch nationals, 44 citizens of Malaysia, 27 from Australia and others from Indonesia, the United Kingdom, Germany, Belgium, the Philippines, Canada and New Zealand. On behalf of the Government and People of the Republic of Trinidad and Tobago, I extend deep condolences to the Governments and Peoples of these countries on the loss of their loved ones - family members, friends and colleagues. I enjoin our prayers to theirs and trust that our expression of solidarity will strengthen their spirit at this very challenging moment".

 Turkish President Abdullah Gül has offered his condolences to the Dutch and Malaysian King. The Turkish Foreign Ministry called the plane crash an act of terrorism that requires thorough investigation.

 Turkmen President Gurbanguly Berdimuhamedow sent condolences to Malaysian Prime Minister, Dutch King and Australian Governor-General over the plane crash, which resulted in deaths of the passengers most of whom were citizens of these countries. On his statement, he told "On behalf of the Turkmenistan's people and the Government, I expressed deep sympathy and support to the families and friends of the victims".

 Ukrainian President Petro Poroshenko vowed support for a Dutch probe into the crash, which he called an act of terrorism. He offered condolences for the air disaster in a telephone conversation with Dutch Prime Minister Mark Rutte. Ukrainian citizens brought flowers to the Dutch and Malaysian embassies in Kyiv in support.

 UAE President Sheikh Khalifa bin Zayed Al Nahyan sent a message of condolence to the Malaysian King Tuanku Abdul Halim Mu'adzam Shah on the tragedy. UAE Vice-President and Prime Minister and Ruler of Dubai Sheikh Mohammed bin Rashid Al Maktoum and Abu Dhabi Crown Prince and Deputy Supreme Commander of the UAE Armed Forces General Sheikh Mohamed bin Zayed Al Nahyan also sent similar messages of condolences to Malaysian Prime Minister Najib Razak. The UAE Disaster Victims Identification (DVI) have been sent to take part in identifying the remains of victims killed in the downing of the aircraft.

 The British government requested an emergency meeting of the United Nations Security Council and called an emergency Cobra meeting after the incident. Prime Minister David Cameron said he was "shocked and saddened by the Malaysian air disaster", and that "those responsible must be brought to account". The Department for Transport ordered "flights already airborne" to bypass south-eastern regions of the country.

 US President Barack Obama said the US would help determine the cause. In a press statement, White House spokesman Josh Earnest called for an immediate ceasefire in Ukraine to allow for a full investigation. Vice-President Joe Biden said the plane appeared to have been deliberately shot down, and vowed US assistance for the investigation into the crash. US Ambassador to the United Nations Samantha Power stated that the flight "was likely downed by a surface-to-air missile, an SA-11, operated from a separatist-held location in eastern Ukraine", that the US could not "rule out technical assistance by Russian personnel" in operating the system, and that "Russia must end this war". President Obama later stated that Russia should "pivot away from the strategy they've been taking and get serious about trying to resolve hostilities within Ukraine".

 The Uruguayan government condemned "any act of aggression" and sent a message of sympathy to the families of victims. The government under President José Mujica expressed their "deep regret over the tragic death of 298 people". According to Uruguayan Foreign Ministry, they condemned the use of violence and "any act of aggression" but made no clear reference to the suspicion that the  plane was shot down by a missile.

 The Venezuelan Foreign Ministry in a statement about the plane crash highlighting that the people and government of Venezuela join the mourning with the victims families and hopes a necessary investigation to accurately identify those responsible for these acts.

 President Trương Tấn Sang sent a message of condolences to the Malaysian King while Prime Minister Nguyễn Tấn Dũng and Deputy Prime Minister and Foreign Minister Phạm Bình Minh offered sympathies to the Malaysian prime minister and foreign minister, as well as to the Dutch Prime Minister. Vietnamese Ministry of Foreign Affairs by its spokesman Lê Hải Bình said in a statement "We are deeply saddened when hearing about the crash of the Malaysia Airlines flight MH17 causing massive fatalities. We would like to extend our deepest condolences and sympathy to the Governments and people of countries whose citizens were killed in the accident as well as families of the victims".

Organisations
 Association of Southeast Asian NationsASEAN member states strongly condemn the downing of Flight 17 and called for an independent and transparent investigation into the catastrophe. They also conveyed their profound sorrow and condolences to the families of those on board.
  Donbass People's MilitiaPro-Russian-rebel commander Igor Girkin was quoted as stating that "a significant number of the bodies weren't fresh", although he stated that he could not confirm the information. He followed up by saying "Ukrainian authorities are capable of any baseness"; Girkin also said that blood serum and medications were found in the plane's remnants in large quantities.
 The European Union representatives José Manuel Barroso and Herman Van Rompuy released a joint statement calling for immediate and thorough investigation. The EU officials also said that Ukraine has first claim on the plane's black boxes.
  International Civil Aviation Organization ICAO declared that it was sending its team of experts to assist the National Bureau of Incidents and Accidents Investigation of Civil Aircraft (NBAAII) of Ukraine, which according to ICAO is the country in charge of the investigation under Article 26 of the Convention on International Civil Aviation.
 NATO said this incident highlighted the fact that the conflict in that area was becoming more dangerous. NATO Secretary General Anders Rasmussen stated, "I am profoundly shocked and saddened by the crash of a Malaysia Airlines passenger aircraft in Ukraine today, with the loss of many lives." After offering his condolences to those affected, he added, "It is important that a full international investigation should be launched immediately, without any hindrance, to establish the facts and that those who may be responsible are swiftly brought to justice."
  Organization for Security and Co-operation in EuropeChairperson-in-Office and Swiss President Didier Burkhalter expressed "his sincere condolences to the families of the many victims of the shocking crash of the Malaysian Airlines Flight MH17 over Ukrainian territory". He also stated that "the OSCE stands ready to support Ukraine in this difficult rescue operation in every possible way."
  United Nations Security CouncilThe U.N. Security Council held an emergency meeting on Ukraine crisis. A British-drafted statement calling for "a full, thorough and independent international investigation" into what caused the crash and stressing the need for "all parties to grant immediate access by investigators to the crash site to determine the cause of the incident" was discussed. On 21 July, the UNSC has adopted Resolution 2166 to investigate on the possible criminal aspect of the crash.

Memorials
Since the crash, memorial services have been held in Australia and the Netherlands, with the Netherlands declaring a national day of mourning. The opening ceremony of the AIDS 2014 conference, of which several delegates were on board flight MH17, began with a tribute to the victims of the crash. In Malaysia, makeshift memorials were created in the capital city of Kuala Lumpur.

References

Malaysia Airlines Flight 17
2014 in international relations
Malaysia Airlines Flight 17 shootdown
Malaysia Airlines Flight 17 shootdown
Aviation history of Ukraine
2014 in Ukraine